No. 543 Squadron RAF was a photographic reconnaissance squadron of the Royal Air Force, active in two periods between 1942 and 1974.

History
The squadron was formed on 19 October 1942 at RAF Benson as a photo-reconnaissance unit with the Supermarine Spitfire. A detachment was stationed at RAF St Eval, Cornwall to carry out reconnaissance flights over France. The rest of the squadron carried out operational training. On 18 October 1943 the squadron was disbanded.

On 24 September 1955 the squadron was reformed at RAF Gaydon to operate the Vickers Valiant for reconnaissance duties. It moved to RAF Wyton in  November 1955. The squadron's official war role was to carry out pre- and post-strike reconnaissance in support of the RAF's nuclear-armed V-bombers, although the post-strike bomb damage assessment mission was soon abandoned as impracticable in a nuclear war. The squadron carried out frequent long-range survey flights, including mapping Thailand in 1959 and 1961 in Operation Segment, and surveying Northern Rhodesia, Southern Rhodesia and Bechuanaland (now Zambia, Zimbabwe and Botswana respectively) in 1964 in Operation Pontifex. Other photo survey duties were carried out to aid relief efforts following natural disasters, with Valiants despatched to survey the damage following the 1960 Agadir earthquake and mapped British Honduras in December 1961 following the devastating Hurricane Hattie. The squadron also carried out Maritime Reconnaissance over the North Atlantic, Norwegian and Barents Seas. In 1964, the Valiant developed metal fatigue problems, with one of the squadron's Valiants was found to have a cracked wing spar in July 1964 during Operation Pontifex. Inspection of the squadron's aircraft in October 1964 found that only two of eight were fit for further service. The RAF's Valiant fleet, including No. 543's aircraft, were grounded on 26 January 1965. 

The squadron re-equipped with the Handley Page Victor in 1965, receiving its first Victor B(SR)2 on 19 May 1965 and reaching its full strength of eight aircraft by April 1966. The squadron's Victors increasingly concentrated on the Maritime Radar Reconnaissance role, as photographic duties could be carried out for less money by the RAF's English Electric Canberras, but the Victors' cameras were retained until 1974. The squadron had a secondary role of air sampling  This involved flying through plumes of airborne contamination and using onboard equipment to collect fallout released from French and Chinese nuclear tests for later analysis at the Atomic Weapons Research Establishment at Aldermaston. The squadron also found time to enter two Victors in the May 1969 Daily Mail Trans-Atlantic Air Race.  It was disbanded on 24 May 1974 at RAF Wyton.

Aircraft operated

Commanding Officers

Squadron Bases

See also
List of Royal Air Force aircraft squadrons

References

Notes

Bibliography

 .
 .
 .
 .
 .
 .
 .

 .

External links
 543 Squadron Aircrew Association
 Bases and airfields used on www.rafcommands.com
 Squadron histories for nos. 541–598 sqn on rafweb

Aircraft squadrons of the Royal Air Force in World War II
543 Squadron
Reconnaissance units and formations of the Royal Air Force
Military units and formations established in 1942
Military units and formations disestablished in 1974